Nurettin Ersin (1918 – 3 October 2005) was a Turkish general. He was the Commander of the 6th Corps during the 1974 invasion of Cyprus, and the Commander of the Turkish Army during the 1980 military coup. After the coup he was a member of the Presidential Council, and was Chief of the General Staff of Turkey in the second half of 1983.

Ersin, who was born in Çanakkale, was also head of the National Intelligence Organization (2 August 1971 – 25 July 1973), Secretary General of the National Security Council (5 January 1976 – 30 August 1977), and  Commander of the First Army of Turkey (30 August 1977 – 8 March 1978).

References

External links
Chiefs of General Staff , Turkish General Staff.

1918 births
2005 deaths
Turkish Army generals
Commanders of the Turkish Land Forces
Chiefs of the Turkish General Staff
General Commanders of the Gendarmerie of Turkey
Secretaries General of the National Security Council (Turkey)
People from Çanakkale